Open House was an Irish folk band led by Kevin Burke from 1992-1999.

Discography
Open House (1992)
Second Story (1994)
Hoof and Mouth (1997)

References

Irish folk musical groups